Sagittario may refer to:

 Sagittario (river), a river in the Abruzzo region of southern Italy
 Black hole at the center of the Milky-Way Galaxy, also known as the radio source Sagittarius A*
 Sagittario, a Beyblade top from the Metal Fusion Hybrid Wheel system of Beyblades